Leopold Grausam (born 29 June 1943) is an Austrian retired footballer.

References

External links
 Rapid Archiv
 Sturm Archiv

1943 births
Living people
Austrian footballers
Austria international footballers
Association football forwards
SK Rapid Wien players
FC Wacker Innsbruck players
LASK players
FC Grenchen players
Austrian football managers
Floridsdorfer AC managers
People from Sankt Pölten
Austrian expatriate sportspeople in Switzerland
Expatriate footballers in Switzerland
Austrian expatriate footballers